The Rauenkopf, also Rauchenkopf, is a mountain northeast of Reith bei Seefeld in the Karwendel Alps in the Austrian state of Tyrol. It is 2,011 metres high.

Ascent 
There is no marked route to the top. However a mountain path to the Reither Spitze, known as the Reither Spitzsteig, passes by 250 metres northwest of the summit.

References 

Mountains of Tyrol (state)
Two-thousanders of Austria
Mountains of the Alps